Gaines is an unincorporated community in Tioga County, Pennsylvania, United States. Gaines has a post office with ZIP code 16921, which opened on August 8, 1849.

References

Unincorporated communities in Tioga County, Pennsylvania
Unincorporated communities in Pennsylvania